The Carpenters Building (also known as United Brotherhood of Carpenters and Joiners-Local 132) is an historic office building located at 1010 10th Street (also known as 1001 K Street, N.W.) Northwest, Washington, D.C., in the Mount Vernon Square neighborhood.

History
The eight-story, brick and limestone, Commercial style office building was designed by architect O. Harvey Miller. It follows Louis Sullivan in his designs of tall office buildings.

The Carpenters Building was believed to be the country's largest building owned by a local union when constructed in 1926.
It was sold by the local in 1980.

The property was listed on the National Register of Historic Places, on September 17, 2003.

References

External links

http://wikimapia.org/13642951/Carpenters-Building

Buildings and structures on the National Register of Historic Places in Washington, D.C.
Buildings and structures completed in 1926
United Brotherhood of Carpenters and Joiners of America
Chicago school architecture in the United States